Gelechia exposita is a moth of the family Gelechiidae. It is found on Borneo.

References

Moths described in 1926
Gelechia